The 2010–11 Libyan Premier League (known as the Libyana Premier League for sponsorship reasons) is the forty-third edition of the competition since its inception in 1963. A total of 12 clubs will contest the league, with Ittihad the defending champions. The fixtures for the 2010–11 season were drawn on 3 August 2010 on air at 19:30 EET. The season began on 9 August 2010 with the 12 teams agreed upon by the LFF, but, after several rounds of talks, Ahly Tripoli were re-instated following their withdrawal from the league last season, in addition to Tahaddy, Najma and Wahda, the other two sides relegated and last season's Second Division runners-up, respectively.

The season was abandoned half-way due to the Libyan Civil War.

Teams
A total of twelve teams were to contest the league, meaning the league has been reduced in size for the second consecutive season, with eleven teams from the 2009–10 season and one promoted from the 2009–10 Libyan Second Division. However, after the addition of the aforementioned sides, the league returned to a 16-team format.

Ahly Tripoli, Tahaddy and Najma were relegated from the 2009–10 Libyan Premier League after finishing in the bottom three places in the table. Tahaddy and Najma were relegated after just one year each in the top flight, while Ahly Tripoli were relegated by the LFF following a 13-year tenure, after failing to show for two consecutive games, amid protests about unfair treatment.

Darnes secured promotion to the Premier League after a 3–1 victory over Jazeera in the Promotion Stage of the Second Division, returning to the top flight after a twelve-year absence. Olomby were the final side to secure their place for next season, defeating Wahda 3–1 on aggregate in the Relegation Playoff.

Ahly, Najma and Tahaddy were later re-instated, as were Wahda, to make up a 16-team league for this season.

Team Summaries

League table

Results

Season statistics

Scoring
First goal of the season:  Abdelhameed al Zaidani (Akhdar) against Madina – 2 minutes and 8 seconds (9 August 2010)
Fastest goal in a match: 1 minutes 48 seconds –  Fraj Abdelhafeedh for Ahly Benghazi against Shat (10 August 2010)
Goal scored at latest point in a match: 97 minutes 32 seconds –  Idrees al Qat'aani for Ahly Benghazi against Shat (10 August 2010)
Widest winning margin: 4 goals
Shat 0–4 Ahly Benghazi (10 August 2010)
Most goals in a match by one team: 4 goals – Shat 0–4 Ahly Benghazi (10 August 2010)
Most goals in one half: 4 goals – Akhdar 2–3 Madina (1–0 at half time) (9 August 2010)
Most goals in one half by a single team: 3 goals
Akhdar 2–3 Madina (1–0 at half time) (9 August 2010)
Shat 0–4 Ahly Benghazi (0–1 at half time) (10 August 2010)
Most goals in one match by a single player: 2 goals
 Camara Sanosar for Madina against Akhdar (9 August 2010)
 Sapol Mani for Ittihad against Darnes (9 August 2010)
 Fraj Abdelhafeedh for Ahly Benghazi against Shat (10 August 2010)

References

External links
Season on soccerway.com

Libyan Premier League seasons
Libyan Premier League
1
Cancelled association football competitions